Stephanbeckia is a monotypic genus of flowering plants belonging to the family Asteraceae. The only species is Stephanbeckia plumosa.

The species is found in Bolivia.

References

Asteraceae
Monotypic Asteraceae genera